The Liar Game manga is written by Shinobu Kaitani, and is published by Shueisha in the Weekly Young Jump magazine starting in 2005. After remaining in hiatus for 1.5 years, the manga was resumed once again. However, in February, 2013, the manga went into hiatus briefly once more, before resuming its run all the way to the end in January, 2015.



Volume list

References

Liar Game
Liar Game

ja:LIAR GAME
zh:LIAR GAME